Barnard Castle Market Cross (also known as the Butter Market) in the market town of Barnard Castle, Teesdale, County Durham, England, was built in 1747. It is a Grade I listed building.

Gallery

References

External links
Market Cross – Newcastle University
Market Cross – BritishListedBuildings.co.uk
Market Cross, Barnard Castle, County Durham (Cavan Corrigan) – ArtUK

Grade I listed buildings in County Durham
Market crosses in England